The 1925 St. Ignatius Gray Fog football team was an American football team that represented St. Ignatius College (later renamed the University of San Francisco) as an independent during the 1925 college football season. In its second season under head coach Jimmy Needles, the Gray Fog compiled a 2–4–1 record and was outscored by a total of 59 to 45. The team played its home games at Ewing Field in San Francisco.

Schedule

References

St. Ignatius
San Francisco Dons football seasons
St. Ignatius Gray Fog football